Nationality words link to articles with information on the nation's poetry or literature (for instance, Irish or France).

Events
 The American Monthly Magazine is started in Boston by Nathaniel Parker Willis as a humorous and satirical magazine with essays, fiction, criticism, poetry and humor, largely written by the editor. Other contributors include John Lothrop Motley, Richard Hildreth, Lydia Huntley Sigourney, and Albert Pike. The publication was later absorbed by the New York Mirror
 After the New Harmony utopian community dissolved in 1828, Francis Wright renames the New-Harmony Gazette to the Free Enquirer and broadens its focus to present more socialist and agnostic views
 John Neal, The Yankee and Boston Literary Gazette magazine new series volume 1, the first substantial published criticism of poetry by Edgar Allan Poe

Works published in English

United Kingdom
 George Crabbe, The Poetical Works of George Crabbe, the first single volume of the author's collected works
 Thomas Doubleday, Dioclesian
 Ebenezer Elliott, The Village Patriarch
 Thomas Hood, The Epping Hunt, illustrated by George Cruikshank
 Caroline Norton, published anonymously
The Sorrows of Rosalie: A Tale with Other Poems
 I Do Not Love Thee
 The Cold Change
 Prolusiones Academicae, including "Timbuctoo" by Alfred Tennyson (first published in the Cambridge Chronicle, July 10), and poems by C. R. Kennedy and C. Merivale
 Letitia Elizabeth Landon, writing under the pen name "L.E.L.", The Venetian Bracelet, The Lost Pleiad, A History of the Lyre and Other Poems

United States

 Lucretia Maria Davidson, Amir Khan, and Other Poems, published posthumously and edited by her mother
 George Moses Horton, The Hope of Liberty, the first book by an African American poet in more than 50 years and the first by an African American from the South; contains 23 poems, including three on the author's feelings about having been a slave; he had hoped to make enough money from this and later poetry books to buy his freedom, but was unsuccessful; published in Raleigh, North Carolina
 Samuel Kettell, Specimens of American Poetry, with Critical and Biographical Notices, the first comprehensive anthology of American poetry; including 189 poets, a historical introduction and chronological listing of American poetry; the publisher, Samuel Goodrich, lost $1,500 on the publication and was annoyed to learn it had been nicknamed "Goodrich's Kettle of Poetry"
 Edgar Allan Poe, Al Aaraaf, Tamerlane, and Other Poems, including "Al Aaraaf" a shortened version of "Tamerlane", and "Fairyland"
 William Gilmore Simms, The Vision of Cortes, Cain, and other Poems

Works published in other languages

France
 Victor Hugo:
 Les Orientales France
 La Légende des siècles, second series (first series 1859, third series 1883)
 Charles-Augustin Sainte-Beuve, Vie, poesie et pensees de Joseph Delorme, France
 Alfred de Vigny, Poemes antiques et modernes (expanded from the first edition, 1826)

Other languages
 Alexander Pushkin. Poltava
 Henrik Wergeland, Digte, første Ring; and Creation, Man and the Messiah, epic poem by the Norwegian poet; the sheer scale of the poem invited to criticism; in 1845, on his deathbed, Wergeland will revise the poem and publish it under the title Man.

Births
Death years link to the corresponding "[year] in poetry" article:
 January 12 - Rosanna Eleanor Leprohon, Canadian poet (died 1879)
 July 25 - Elizabeth Siddal, English artists' model, poet, painter and muse (died 1862)
 September 18 - Edna Dean Proctor, American poet (died 1923)
 December 8 - Henry Timrod, American "poet laureate of the Confederacy" (died 1867)
 December 31 - Alexander Smith, Scottish poet of the Spasmodic school (died 1867)
 Black Bart, English-born American gentleman stagecoach robber and versifier (vanished 1888)

Deaths
Death years link to the corresponding "[year] in poetry" article:
 January 11 - Karl Wilhelm Friedrich von Schlegel, German poet and critic (born 1772)
 February 9 - William Crowe, English poet (born 1745)
 May 29 - Sir Humphry Davy, English chemist, inventor and poet (born 1778)

See also

 Poetry
 List of years in poetry
 List of years in literature
 19th century in literature
 19th century in poetry
 Romantic poetry
 Golden Age of Russian Poetry (1800–1850)
 Weimar Classicism period in Germany, commonly considered to have begun in 1788  and to have ended either in 1805, with the death of Friedrich Schiller, or 1832, with the death of Goethe
 List of poets

Notes

19th-century poetry

Poetry